Billy Porter (25 July 1875 – 16 March 1910) was an Australian rules footballer who played with St Kilda in the Victorian Football League (VFL).

References

External links 		
		

1875 births
1910 deaths
Australian rules footballers from Victoria (Australia)
St Kilda Football Club players